Higher Town is the easternmost and largest settlement on the island of St Martin's in the Isles of Scilly, England. It is situated just inland, though the more modern of the island's two quays is just south of the settlement and is named Higher Town Quay.

The town has a bakery, St Martin's Bakery, and the island's main shop and only post office.

Both of the island's churches are in Higher Town: the Church of England parish church of St Martin, and a Methodist chapel (one of two in the Isles of Scilly) which dates from about 1845. The island's fire and coastguard station is next to the parish church.

St Agnes
There is also a small settlement called Higher Town on the island of St Agnes. The island's pub (the Turk's Head) is between Higher Town and the island's quay at Porth Conger.

References

Villages in the Isles of Scilly
St Martin's, Isles of Scilly